Saints Gervasius and Protasius (also Saints Gervase and Protase, Gervasis and Prothasis and in French Gervais and Protais) are venerated as Christian martyrs, probably of the 2nd century. They are the patron saints of Milan and of haymakers and are invoked for the discovery of thieves. Their feast day in the Latin Rite of the Catholic Church is 19 June, the day marking the translation of their relics. In the Eastern Orthodox Church and in the Eastern Rites of the Catholic Church, their feast takes place on 14 October (O.S.)/24 October (N.S.), the traditional day of their death. In Christian iconography their emblems are the scourge, the club and the sword.

Legend
The acta may have been expanded from a letter (Epistle liii) to the bishops of Italy, falsely ascribed to Saint Ambrose. They are written in a very simple style; it has not been possible to establish the date of their composition. According to these, Gervasius and Protasius were the twin sons of martyrs. Their father, Saint Vitalis of Milan, a man of consular dignity, suffered martyrdom at Ravenna, possibly under Nero. Their mother, Saint Valeria, died for her faith at Milan. Gervasius and Protasius were imprisoned, and visited in prison by Saint Nazarius.

The sons are said to have large hands and had been scourged and then beheaded, during the reign of the Emperor Nero, under the presidency of Anubinus or Astasius, and while Caius was Bishop of Milan. Some authors place the martyrdom under the Emperor Diocletian, but others object to this time, because it is not clear how, in that case, the place of burial, and even the names, could be forgotten by the time of Saint Ambrose, as is stated. It probably occurred during the reign of Emperor Marcus Aurelius (161-180).

Ambrose and Saints Gervasius and Protasius
 
Saint Ambrose, in 386, had built a magnificent basilica at Milan, now called the Basilica Sant'Ambrogio. Asked by the people to consecrate it in the same solemn manner as was done in Rome, he promised to do so if he could obtain the necessary relics. In a dream, he was shown the place where such relics could be found. He ordered excavations to be made outside the city, in the cemetery Church of Saints Nabor and Felix, who were at the time the primary patrons of Milan, and there found the relics of Saints Gervasius and Protasius. In a letter, St Ambrose wrote: "I found the fitting signs, and on bringing in some on whom hands were to be laid, the power of the holy martyrs became so manifest, that even whilst I was still silent, one was seized and thrown prostrate at the holy burial-place. We found two men of marvelous stature, such as those of ancient days. All the bones were perfect, and there was much blood."

St Ambrose had their relics removed to the Basilica of Fausta (now the Church of Saints Vitalis and Agricola), and on the next day into the basilica, accompanied in the texts by many miracles, emblematic of divine favor in the context of the great struggle then taking place between St Ambrose and the Arian Empress Justina. Of the vision, the subsequent discovery of the relics and the accompanying miracles, St Ambrose wrote to his sister Marcellina.

Saint Augustine, not yet baptized, claims to have witnessed these events and relates them in his "Confessions" (IX, vii), and in "De Civitate Dei" (XXII, viii) as well as in his "Sermon 286 in natal. Ss. Mm. Gerv. et Prot.". They are also alleged by Saint Paulinus in his life of Saint Ambrose. The latter died in 397 and by his own wish was buried in his basilica by the side of these martyrs. It has been suggested that the Brescia Casket was made for or used to hold the relics.

Veneration

J. Rendel Harris, in "The Dioscuri in the Christian Legends" (London, 1903), addressed the subject of twin saints in Christian legend, who seem to be connected with the Dioscuri, whose cult was tenacious, surmised from an oration decrying their veneration by Dio Chrystostom ("Orations" 61.11). The historicity of Gervasius and Protasius was defended in the "Analecta Bollandist." (1904), XXIII, 427.

Immediately after the discovery of the relics by Saint Ambrose, the cult of Saints Gervasius and Protasius was spread in Italy, churches were built in their honor at Pavia, Nola and other places. In Gaul (modern-day France), Around the year 400 churches were dedicated to them, at Mans, Rouen and Soissons. At the Louvre in Paris, there is now a famous picture of the saints by Lesueur (d. 1655), which was formerly in their church, Saint-Gervais-Saint-Protais in Paris. According to the "Liber Pontificalis," Pope Innocent I (402-417) dedicated a church to them at Rome. Later, the name of St Vitalis, their father, was added to the title of this church (Basilica of San Vitale). Very early on, their names were inserted into the Litany of the Saints.

In 835, Angilbert II, Bishop of Milan, placed the relics of the three saints in a porphyry sarcophagus, where they were found in January 1864.

A tradition claims that, after the destruction of Milan by Frederick Barbarossa, his chancellor, Rainald of Dassel, had taken the relics from Milan and deposited them at Breisach in Germany, whence some came to Soissons. The claim is rejected by Milan.

Nevertheless, they were venerated by farmers in Germany and a German saying amongst harvesters was: "Wenn's regnet auf Gervasius / es vierzig Tage regnen muss" ("When it rains on St Gervasius' Day / forty days of rain will follow"). Thus, as with the cults of Saint Swithun, Saint Medard, the Seven Sleepers, and Saint Godelieve, that of Sts Gervasius and Protasius was connected with the weather.

A famous series of tapestries of the "Life of Gervasius and Protasius," donated to the Cathedral of Antwerp in 1509, is displayed in the cathedral's choir.

See also
Kantheesangal
St-Gervais-et-St-Protais Church
San Gervasio (disambiguation)
San Trovaso

Notes

References

 Ambrose, ed. & tr. by John Hugo Wolfgang Gideon Liebeschuetz, Ambrose Of Milan: Political Letters And Speeches (google preview), 2005, Liverpool University Press, 9780853238294; full text Ambrose of Milan: Letter 22: The Finding of SS. Gervasius and Protasius, Fordham

External links

Gervase
Protase
Saints Gervasius and Protasius at the Christian Iconography web site.
Here Follow the Lives of Saints Gervase and Prothase from Caxton's translation of the Golden Legend
St Gervase Colonnade Statue in St Peter's Square
St Protase Colonnade Statue in St Peter's Square
 Santi Gervasio e Protasio
 Ökumenisches Heiligenlexikon über Gervasius

2nd-century deaths
2nd-century Christian martyrs
Burials at the Basilica of Sant'Ambrogio
Saints from Roman Italy
Twins from ancient Rome
Year of birth unknown
Year of death unknown
Saints duos